Saint-Sauveur is a town and municipality within the Les Pays-d'en-Haut Regional County Municipality, Quebec, Canada. It is in the administrative region of Laurentides in the Laurentian mountains, located about 60 kilometres north of Montreal.

St-Sauveur is well known for its local ski areas, the biggest of which is Mont Saint-Sauveur. The ski areas market themselves jointly under the name of "Valley of Saint-Sauveur". Its proximity to Montreal, as well as its snow-making capability, night-time skiing, and après-ski establishments make St-Sauveur a popular destination for skiers.

The town was the childhood home—from about 1946 to 1960—of Canadian musicians Kate and Anna McGarrigle.

On September 11, 2002 the city was created from the merger of the village of Saint-Sauveur-des-Monts and the parish municipality of Saint-Sauveur. The current director general is Jean Beaulieu. The city clerk is Normand Patrice.

Demographics 

Population trend:
 Population in 2021: 11580 (2006 to 2011 population change: 13.2%)
 Population in 2016: 10231 (2006 to 2011 population change: 3.5%)
 Population in 2011: 9881 (2006 to 2011 population change: 7.5%)
 Population in 2006: 9191  (2001 to 2006 population change: 13.2%)
 Population in 2001: 8122
 Saint-Sauveur (Parish): 4806
 Saint-Sauveur-des-Monts (Village): 3316
 Population in 1996:
 Saint-Sauveur (Parish): 3970
 Saint-Sauveur-des-Monts (Village): 2904
 Population in 1991:
 Saint-Sauveur (Parish): 2719
 Saint-Sauveur-des-Monts (Village): 2545

Mother tongue:
 English as first language: 7.1%
 French as first language: 86.8%
 English and French as first language: 2%
 Other as first language: 3.5%

Education

Sir Wilfrid Laurier School Board operates Anglophone public schools:
 Morin Heights Elementary School in Morin-Heights
 Laurentian Regional High School in Lachute

Notable residents
Frédéric Allard, ice hockey player
Omer Létourneau, organist, composer and conductor
Kate and Anna McGarrigle, singer/songwriter duo
Chris Ramsay, Canadian magician and YouTuber

Mayors 
Georges Filion - 2002–2005
Michel Lagacé - 2005–2013
Jacques Gariépy - 2013–present

The first mayor of Saint-Sauveur was William Henry Scott, who took office in 1855 when the parish municipality was incorporated. The parish had 21 mayors from 1855 to 2002. The village of Saint-Sauveur-des-Monts was carved out of the parish municipality in 1926 and thereafter had its own council and mayor.

Images

See also
List of cities in Quebec

References

External links

City of Saint-Sauveur website
Valley of Saint-Sauveur Ski Resorts
Saint-Sauveur business and tourism
Directory of lodging, restaurants and activities
Photo Gallery Saint-Sauveur, Quebec, Canada
Forum Directory and News for Saint-Sauveur, Quebec, Canada

Cities and towns in Quebec
Incorporated places in Laurentides

zh:圣索沃